There have been four Abdy baronetcies, three of which were created for sons of Anthony Abdy (1579–1640) in the Baronetage of England. These are extinct. The 1849 creation is dormant.

 Abdy baronets of Felix Hall (1641)
 Abdy baronets of Albyns (1660)
 Abdy baronets of Moores (1660)
 Abdy baronets of Albyns (1849)

Set index articles on titles of nobility